The Gerald Loeb Award is given annually for multiple categories of business reporting. The Gerald Loeb Memorial Award was created in 1974 to honor business and financial writers whose high-caliber work covered a broad spectrum of the profession. The final Memorial Award was given in 1974.

 1974: Joseph A. Livingston of The Philadelphia Inquirer
 1975: Vermont Royster, contributing editor and member of the board of directors of Dow Jones and Co. Inc.
 1976: John McDonald, author and former senior editor at Fortune Magazine
 1977: Leonard Silk, economics editor at Business Week, then economics columnist at The New York Times
 1978: Hedley Donovan, Time, Inc.

References

External links
 Gerald Loeb Award historical winners list

 
American journalism awards
Gerald Loeb Award winners